Poa fordeana  is a grass (family Poaceae) which is native to Australia and found in New South Wales, Victoria, South Australia and Queensland.

It was first described in 1873 by Ferdinand von Mueller from a specimen collected by Helena Scott  (Mrs Forde) whom the specific epithet, fordeana, honours.

References

External links
 Poa fordeana Occurrence data from The Australasian Virtual Herbarium 

Flora of New South Wales
Flora of Victoria (Australia)
Flora of South Australia
Flora of Queensland
fordeana
Plants described in 1873
Taxa named by Ferdinand von Mueller